This is a list of Georgian football transfers winter 2021–22. Only clubs in 2021 Erovnuli Liga are included.

Dinamo Batumi 

In:

Out:

Dinamo Tbilisi 

In:

Out:

Dila Gori 

In:

Out:

Gagra 

In:

Out:

Locomotive Tbilisi 

In:

Out:

Saburtalo Tbilisi 

In:

Out:

Samgurali Tsqaltubo 

In:

Out:

Samtredia 

In:

Out:

Shukura Kobuleti 

In:

Out:

Sioni Bolnisi 

In:

Out:

Telavi 

In:

Out:

Torpedo Kutaisi 

In:

Out:

References

Georgia
Transfers
2021-22